Peppermint is a 1999 Greek film directed by Costas Kapakas. It was Greece's submission to the 73rd Academy Awards for the Academy Award for Best Foreign Language Film, but was not accepted as a nominee.

Plot
A reunion party of old schoolmates becomes the cause an engineer of airplanes to travel back in his life. He remembers his childhood and his extraordinary relationship with his cousin Marina. Along with the lives of the protagonists, the film presents the Greek society between 1955 and 1973.

Cast
Georges Corraface as Stefanos Karouzos
Any Loulou as Alkistis Karouzou
Alexandros Mylonas as Pavlos Karouzos
Nikoletta Vlavianou as Ariadni
Tasos Palatzidis as Michalakis
Giorgos Gerontidakis-Sempetadelis as Stefanos Karouzos at 12
Markella Pappa as Marina at 12

Reception

Awards
winner:  
1999: Greek State Film Awards for Best Film
1999: Greek State Film Awards for Best Debut Director (Costas Kapakas)
1999: Greek State Film Awards for Best Screenplay (Costas Kapakas)
1999: Greek State Film Awards for Best Actress (Any Loulou)
1999: Greek State Film Awards for Best Supporting Actor (Tasos Palatzidis)
1999: Greek State Film Awards for Best Music (Panagiotis Kalatzopoulos)
1999: Greek State Film Awards for Best Editing
1999: Greek State Film Awards for Best Sound
1999: Greek State Film Awards for Best Make up

nominated:
1999: Thessaloniki International Film Festival for Golden Alexander
2000: Academy Award for Best Foreign Language Film (Not Nominated)

See also

Cinema of Greece
List of submissions to the 73rd Academy Awards for Best Foreign Language Film

References

External links

1999 films
1990s Greek-language films
1999 romantic comedy-drama films
Greek romantic comedy-drama films
1999 comedy films
1999 drama films